Dondukovskaya is a rural locality (a stanitsa) and the administrative center of Dondukovskoye Rural Settlement of Giaginsky District, Adygea, Russia. The population was 6636 as of 2018. There are 56 streets.

Geography 
The stanitsa is located in the steppe zone on the Fars River, 26 km east of Giaginskaya (the district's administrative centre) by road. Krasny Fars is the nearest rural locality.

Ethnicity 
The stanitsa is inhabited by Russians, Armenians, Ukrainians and Adygheans.

References 

Rural localities in Giaginsky District